Razam may refer to:

 Razam (Belarusian political party)
 Belarusian community "RAZAM" e.V.

See also
 Rajam, Andhra Pradesh, a town in India
 Rasam (disambiguation)
 Raza (disambiguation)